Farm Fresh Onions is an album by Texas-based folk singer-songwriter Robert Earl Keen, released in the United States on October 7, 2003 (see 2003 in music).

Track listing
All tracks written by Robert Earl Keen, except where noted.
"Furnace Fan" – 3:58
"All I Have Is Today" – 3:28
"Out Here in the Middle" (James McMurtry) – 4:29
"Train Trek" – 6:00
"Farm Fresh Onions" – 4:46
"Floppy Shoes" – 3:36
"Gone On" – 2:42
"So Sorry Blues" – 4:23
"Beats the Devil" – 3:01
"These Years" – 3:49
"Famous Words" – 3:46
"Let the Music Play" (Robert Earl Keen, Bill Whitbeck) – 5:36
"Farm Fresh Onions Extras" – 3:02

Chart performance

References

External links
Koch Entertainment album website

2003 albums
Robert Earl Keen albums